Gia Chkhaidze (born 27 February 1970) is a Georgian former footballer.

Chkhaidze played twice for Georgia in 1999, once against Ukraine in a friendly and once against Slovenia in UEFA Euro 2000 qualifying.

References

External links

Soviet footballers
Footballers from Georgia (country)
Georgia (country) international footballers
Expatriate footballers from Georgia (country)
FC Dinamo Tbilisi players
FC Guria Lanchkhuti players
FC Spartak Vladikavkaz players
Russian Premier League players
Expatriate footballers in Russia
Association football defenders
1970 births
Living people
FC Dinamo Batumi players
FC FShM Torpedo Moscow players